Polychlorinated carbazoles (PCCZ) are a group of chlorinated organic compounds. They are derivatives of carbazole and nitrogen analogues of polychlorinated dibenzofurans.

Polychlorinated carbazoles usually occur as a mixture of various isomers. This mixture can have a certain frequency pattern (congener pattern) from which conclusions can be drawn about the causes of formation.

PCCZs are not manufactured purposefully. They are formed under certain conditions as by-products of thermal processes. In environmental samples, mixed halogenated carbazoles are also found.

Further reading
 Juliane Kirst: Synthesis of polyhalogenated carbazoles and total synthesis of amaryllidaceae alkaloids pratosine and hippadine. Dissertation, Dresden, 2009. (in German) DNB-IDN 100727316X/34
 
 Liu, Hongyan; Yi, Zhongsheng; Mo, Lingyun: Thermodynamic Properties of Polychlorinated Carbazoles by Density Functional Theory. In: Acta Chim. Sinica, 2009, 67(14), 1626–1634.

References

Carbazoles
Chloroarenes